The Belvedere of Literary Profundity (Manchu:  šu tunggu asari), Wenyuan Ge or Wenyuan Library is a palace building in the Forbidden City in Beijing.

The hall was an imperial library, and a place for learned discussion. Thus some Grand Secretaries were assigned to there. It was sited to the east of the Fengtian Gate in Nanjing, during the Hongwu era. After the Yongle Emperor made Beijing China's capital, its name continued to be used for the lobby in the east of the Cabinet Hall of the Forbidden City, which was burnt down in the late Ming.

The existing hall which is patterned on the Tianyi Ge in Ningbo was rebuilt behind the Wenhua Palace, in the reign of the Qianlong Emperor. Completed in 1776, it was a kind of library and stored numerous works, including a copy of the Siku Quanshu. The Wenjin Ge in the Chengde Mountain Resort is its counterpart.

References

External links
 

Cultural infrastructure completed in 1776
Forbidden City
Libraries in Beijing
Library buildings completed in the 18th century
Ming dynasty architecture
Qing dynasty architecture
Libraries established in 1776